Phyllophaga gracilis is a species of scarab beetle in the family Scarabaeidae. It is found in North America.

Subspecies
These two subspecies belong to the species Phyllophaga gracilis:
 Phyllophaga gracilis angulata Glasgow, 1925
 Phyllophaga gracilis gracilis

References

Further reading

 

Melolonthinae
Articles created by Qbugbot
Beetles described in 1855
Beetles of North America